The 2007 Nigerian Senate election in Rivers State was held on 21 April 2007, to elect members of the Nigerian Senate to represent Rivers State. George Thompson Sekibo representing Rivers East, Wilson Asinobi Ake representing Rivers West and Lee Maeba representing Rivers South East all won on the platform of the Peoples Democratic Party.

Overview

Summary

Results

Rivers East 
The election was won by George Thompson Sekibo of the Peoples Democratic Party.

Rivers West 
The election was won by Wilson Asinobi Ake of the Peoples Democratic Party.

Rivers South East 
The election was won by Lee Maeba of the Peoples Democratic Party.

References 

April 2007 events in Nigeria
Rivers State Senate elections
Riv